Ryan Patrick McDonagh (born June 13, 1989) is an American professional ice hockey defenseman for the Nashville Predators of the National Hockey League (NHL). Drafted in the first round, 12th overall, by the Montreal Canadiens in 2007, he played college hockey for the Badgers at the University of Wisconsin–Madison. He also played for the New York Rangers, for whom he served as team captain from October 2014 until being traded to the Tampa Bay Lightning in 2018. McDonagh won back-to-back Stanley Cups with the Lightning in 2020 and 2021. He has played in another 2 finals in 2014 with the Rangers and 2022 with the Lightning.

McDonagh also competes internationally for the United States and was a member of the men's ice hockey team at the 2014 Winter Olympics in Sochi.

Playing career

Amateur

McDonagh attended Cretin-Derham Hall High School in Saint Paul, Minnesota, where as a junior he helped lead his team to the school's first state hockey championship. The following season, he was awarded the 2007 Minnesota Mr. Hockey award, which is given annually to the top senior high school hockey player in the state.

McDonagh was then drafted in the first round, 12th overall, by the Montreal Canadiens on June 22, 2007, in the 2007 NHL Entry Draft. He also won a silver medal with the United States at the 2007 IIHF World U18 Championships.

Two years later, McDonagh represented the Americans at the 2009 World Junior Ice Hockey Championships.

On June 30, 2009, McDonagh was traded (along with Chris Higgins, Pavel Valentenko and Doug Janik) to the New York Rangers in exchange for Scott Gomez, Tom Pyatt and Michael Busto.

Professional

New York Rangers (2011–2018)
On July 6, 2010, McDonagh signed an entry-level contract with the Rangers, forgoing his senior season at Wisconsin and joining childhood friend and former Wisconsin teammate Derek Stepan in New York. 

After beginning the 2010–11 season with the Rangers' American Hockey League (AHL) affiliate, the Hartford Wolf Pack, he was promoted to the Rangers on January 3, 2011. He played his first career NHL game on January 7, 2011, against the Dallas Stars. He then earned his first NHL point on an assist of a Brandon Prust goal against the Carolina Hurricanes on January 20. On March 20, McDonagh was the victim of an elbow to the head from Pittsburgh Penguins forward Matt Cooke, who was subsequently suspended for the remainder of the regular season and the first round of the 2011 Stanley Cup playoffs.

On April 9, 2011, McDonagh scored the game-winning goal, the first of his career, against the New Jersey Devils, earning the Rangers the eighth and final playoff spot in the Eastern Conference.

As a result of the 2012–13 NHL lockout, McDonagh signed a contract with Barys Astana of the Kontinental Hockey League (KHL). He became the first American NHL player to join the KHL as a result of the lockout.

On July 8, 2013, McDonagh signed a new six-year, $28.2 million contract with New York. He led all Rangers defensemen with 43 points in the 2013–14 season as the Rangers finished fifth in the Eastern Conference. The team defeated the Philadelphia Flyers, Pittsburgh Penguins and Montreal Canadiens en route to the 2014 Stanley Cup Finals against the Los Angeles Kings, where the Rangers lost the series 4–1. During the playoffs, McDonagh was tied for the lead amongst defensemen in assists (13) and ranked second in points (17). For his season's efforts, McDonagh was named Rangers' MVP and the recipient of the Players' Player Award, given to the Ranger "who best exemplifies what it means to be a team player". He became just the second Rangers defenseman to hold both awards after Brian Leetch did so in the 2002–03 season.

On October 6, 2014, McDonagh was named the 27th captain in Rangers history, filling the vacancy left by Ryan Callahan the previous season. Martin St. Louis, Marc Staal, Dan Girardi and Derek Stepan were named his alternates. McDonagh became the fourth-youngest Ranger captain and 11th defenseman to hold the honor. In his first season as captain, he led his team to the Presidents' Trophy and were ultimately eliminated in the Eastern Conference Finals by the Tampa Bay Lightning in seven games. On May 30, 2015, it was revealed that McDonagh had played the final three games of the series with a broken foot.

McDonagh continued his strong play and leadership into the 2015–16 season, his second as team captain. However, during a February 6, 2016, game against the Philadelphia Flyers, McDonagh suffered a concussion after getting punched by Flyers' forward Wayne Simmonds after McDonagh cross-checked Simmonds. McDonagh missed eight games as a result, including a February 14 rematch between the two teams, during which Rangers' rookie defenseman Dylan McIlrath fought Simmonds. Still feeling the effects of the concussion, McDonagh was scratched for two games of the Rangers first round playoff series against the Pittsburgh Penguins, which the Rangers ultimately lost in five games as the Penguins eventually went on to win the Stanley Cup.

Tampa Bay Lightning (2018–2022)
On February 26, 2018, McDonagh was traded (along with J. T. Miller) to the Tampa Bay Lightning in exchange for Libor Hájek, Brett Howden, Vladislav Namestnikov, a first-round pick in the 2018 NHL Entry Draft, and a conditional second-round pick in the 2019 NHL Entry Draft. The trade followed weeks of trade rumors fueled by a team letter to Rangers fans on February 8, 2018, announcing a rebuild. On April 18, 2018, McDonagh played in his 100th career NHL playoff game.

On June 1, 2018, Ryan McDonagh signed a seven-year, $47.25 million contract extension with the Lightning. During the 2018–19 season, McDonagh would enjoy the best offensive season of his career, scoring 9 goals and 46 points during his first full-season in Tampa Bay, finishing 8th in Norris Trophy voting. However, McDonagh was held pointless in Tampa Bay's first-round upset loss to the Columbus Blue Jackets.

In the 2019–20 season, McDonagh embraced his role, along with his defensive partner Erik Černák, as Tampa Bay's shutdown defensive pairing. During the 2020 Stanley Cup playoffs, McDonagh would return to the Stanley Cup Finals for the first time since 2014, while he was a member of the Rangers. This time, the Lightning emerged victorious, winning McDonagh his first Stanley Cup championship.

McDonagh continued his role as one of Tampa Bay's shutdown defenders in the COVID-delayed 2020–21 season. On June 8, 2021, McDonagh played in his 150th Stanley Cup playoff game against the Carolina Hurricanes. The Lightning would go on to repeat as champions in 2021, winning McDonagh his second-consecutive championship. McDonagh led all skaters in plus–minus at +18 during the 2021 Stanley Cup playoffs.

Nashville Predators (2022–present)
On July 3, 2022, McDonagh was traded to the Nashville Predators in exchange for defenseman Philippe Myers and forward Grant Mismash.

Personal life
On July 19, 2013, McDonagh married long-time girlfriend Kaylee Keys at Our Lady of Victory Chapel in his hometown of Saint Paul, Minnesota. The couple had their first child together in October 2016. Former National Football League quarterback Steve Walsh is his uncle. 

After being drafted, McDonagh attended the University of Wisconsin–Madison for three seasons, playing with their ice hockey team, before foregoing his final year to turn pro with the Rangers. In January 2021, McDonagh re-enrolled with the school, taking online classes to complete his final 18 credits and graduate with a degree in Personal Finance. McDonagh studies on days he does not have NHL games and revealed he had always planned to return to school to graduate but core courses were not available remotely while he played professionally, and was able to attend again after courses he was interested in were migrated online during the school's response to the COVID-19 pandemic in Wisconsin.

Career statistics

Regular season and playoffs

International

Awards and honors

References

External links

 

1989 births
American men's ice hockey defensemen
Barys Nur-Sultan players
Connecticut Whale (AHL) players
Hartford Wolf Pack players
Ice hockey people from Saint Paul, Minnesota
Ice hockey players at the 2014 Winter Olympics
Living people
Montreal Canadiens draft picks
Nashville Predators players
National Hockey League All-Stars
National Hockey League first-round draft picks
New York Rangers players
Olympic ice hockey players of the United States
Stanley Cup champions
Wisconsin Badgers men's ice hockey players